The Tasse Lake Deformation Zone is a zone of deformation in Temagami, Ontario, Canada, extending from the western boundary of Chambers Township through Tasse Lake in the east.

See also
Link Lake Deformation Zone
Net Lake-Vermilion Lake Deformation Zone
Northeast Arm Deformation Zone

References

Geologic faults of Temagami
Shear zones